Evangelium vitae translated in English as 'The Gospel of Life', is a papal encyclical published on 25 March 1995 by Pope John Paul II.  It is a comprehensive document setting out the teaching of the Catholic Church on the sanctity of human life and related issues including murder, abortion, euthanasia, and capital punishment, reaffirming the Church's stances on these issues in a way generally considered consistent with previous church teachings.

Contents

Summary 

Evangelium vitae begins with an overview of threats to human life, both past and present, and gives a brief history of the many biblical prohibitions against killing and how this relates to the concept of a culture of life. The encyclical then addresses specific actions in light of these passages, including abortion (quoting Tertullian, who called abortion "anticipated murder to prevent someone from being born"), euthanasia (which John Paul II calls "a disturbing perversion of mercy"), and the death penalty. According to John Paul II and the magisterium the only potentially acceptable use of the death penalty is when it would not otherwise be possible to defend society, a situation that is rare if not non-existent today.

The encyclical also addresses social and environmental factors, stressing the importance of a society which is built around the family rather than a wish to improve efficiency, and emphasizing the duty to care for the poor and the sick. It also deals with the proper place of sex in the relationship of marriage and the edcuation of adolescent teens about relationships and sexuality.

Along with an introduction and conclusion, the letter contains four chapters:

I. Present-day threats to human life (sections 7-28);

II. The Christian message concerning life (sections 29-51);

III. God's holy law (sections 52-77);

IV. For a new culture of human life (sections 78-101).

In terms of historical context, John Paul II alluded to his experience of the Second World War and the Rerum novarum encyclical of Pope Leo XIII (1891) which sought to protect vulnerable workers.

The encyclical quoted from and complemented the Catechism of the Catholic Church (newly published in 1992) at a time when Catholics who had previously lived under communist regimes had more freedom to learn from the Church's teachings, following the end of the Cold War.

Murder
John Paul II regretted the "progressive weakening of individual consciences and in society" around the "direct taking of all innocent human life, especially at its beginning and its end". He affirmed:

While attempts on the life of John Paul  II are not mentioned, he would have written Evangelium vitae with the knowledge of the attempted assassinations in 1981 and 1982 and the Bojinka plot discovered shortly before his visit to World Youth Day 1995 in the Phillipines in January of that year.

Abortion

Evangelium vitae accepted that "the decision to have an abortion is often tragic and painful for the mother" although this can "never justify the deliberate killing of an innocent human being".  The potential pressures on the pregnant woman from the father of the child, the wider family circle and friends, doctors and nurses were also acknowledged.

While John Paul II noted that the Bible's texts "never address the question of deliberate abortion and so do not directly and specifically condemn it ... they show such great respect for the human being in the mother's womb" that a logical consequence was that "You shall not kill" be extended to the unborn child as well. Christian tradition, he added, was "clear and unanimous, from the beginning up to our own day, in describing abortion as a particularly grave moral disorder.  Given this "unanimity in the doctrinal and disciplinary tradition of the Church", Pope Paul VI was able to declare that this tradition regarding abortion is "unchanged and unchangeable". John Paul II stated:

Contraception and sterilization
Contraception and sterilization are mentioned in multiple paragraphs.

The encyclical also says that contraception and abortion are "often closely connected, as fruits of the same tree".

Euthanasia

John Paul II suggested that when the prevailing tendency in society is "to value life only to the extent that it brings pleasure and well-being, suffering seems like an unbearable setback, something from which one must be freed at all costs." The secular mind therefore views death as "rightful liberation" once life is held to be no longer meaningful "because it is filled with pain and inexorably doomed to even greater suffering."

He cautioned that while euthanasia "might seem logical and humane, when looked at more closely [it] is seen to be senseless and inhumane" and associated with an "excessive preoccupation with efficiency" in modern society, which sees the growing number of elderly and disabled people as "intolerable and too burdensome." These people, he added, "are very often isolated by their families and by society".

Euthanasia ― defined as "an action or omission which of itself and by intention causes death, with the purpose of eliminating all suffering" ― was distinguised from decisions to forego medical treatment, towards the end of a life, which was "disproportionate to any expected results" or because they impose an "excessive burden on the patient and his family;" the latter, he maintained, expresses acceptance of the human condition in the face of death when this is "clearly imminent and inevitable."

Palliative care was strongly commended as part of modern medicine for making suffering more bearable in the final stages of an illness and to ensure that the patient is "supported and accompanied in his or her ordeal". He restated teaching by Pope Pius XII that it is licit to relieve pain by narcotics "even when the result is decreased consciousness and a shortening of life" where a serious reason permits this course of treatment.

John Paul II died at the age of 84 on 2 April 2005, and received palliative care in the days before his death at his residence in the Vatican City.

Capital punishment
Evangelium vitae sets the Church's perspective on capital punishment in the context of a need for the state to "render the aggressor incapable of causing harm [which] sometimes involves taking his life". Pope John Paul acknowledged a "growing tendency, both in the Church and in civil society, to demand that [the death penalty] be applied in a very limited way or even that it be abolished completely."

In a subsequent discussion of penal justice, he noted that the primary purpose of the punishment which society inflicts on an offender is "to redress the disorder caused by the offence" through "an adequate punishment for the crime, as a condition for the offender to regain the exercise of his or her freedom". This is aligned with the related purposes of the punishment i.e. to defend public order, ensure public safety, and give the offender an incentive and help to change his or her behaviour and be rehabilitated).

He concluded that, for these purposes to be achieved, the nature and extent of the punishment must be carefully evaluated and decided upon, and ought not go to the extreme of executing the offender except in cases of absolute necessity.  This absolute would only exist in a situation where it would not be possible otherwise to defend society, and "as a result of steady improvements in the organization of the penal system, such cases are very rare, if not practically non-existent." John Paul II restated the underlying principle set forth in the 1992 Catechism of the Catholic Church:

The writing and distribution of Evangelium vitae coincided with the abolition of capital punishment in several European countries after the fall of the Iron Curtain, and also in South Africa under the post-apartheid government.

Authority
The teachings of Evangelium vitae on the immorality of murder, directly willed abortion, and euthanasia are considered infallible by Catholic theologians including "liberals" (Richard Gaillardetz, Hermann Pottmeyer), "moderates" (Francis A. Sullivan), and "conservatives" (Mark Lowery, Lawrence J. Welch). According to these theologians, these three teachings are not examples of papal infallibility, but are examples of the infallibility of the ordinary and universal Magisterium. In other words, Pope John Paul II was not exercising papal infallibility in this encyclical, but he was stating that these doctrines have already been taught infallibly by the bishops of the Catholic Church throughout history. 

To emphasize the infallibility of this teaching, the following steps were taken:

1. Before writing Evangelium vitae, Pope John Paul II surveyed every Catholic bishop in the world asking whether they agreed that murder, directly willed abortion, and euthanasia immoral, and all agreed that they were. To make this connection clear, the pope concluded each of these passages in Evangelium vitae with a reference to the "ordinary and universal magisterium" and a footnote that cited Lumen gentium, section 25.

2. William Levada, Prefect of the Congregation for the Doctrine of the Faith from May 2005 until June 2012, wrote in 1995 that Evangelium vitae teaching regarding abortion was an infallible teaching of the ordinary magisterium.

3. The Congregation for the Doctrine of the Faith stated that these teachings in Evangelium vitae are infallible in its "Commentary on the Concluding Formula of the Professio Fidei", published on June 29, 1998, and signed by Cardinal Ratzinger and Archbishop Tarcisio Bertone.

Nonetheless, moral theologian James Bretzke, SJ, has stated that "it is unclear whether [the] formula [used in Evangelium vitae] meant to claim infallibility" and that "there is no clear consensus that any teaching in the ordinary magisterium claims infallibility." Even if not "infallible" under the teaching authority of the ordinary Magisterium, however, the teachings of Evangelium vitae are still entitled to being "received with the religious respect (obsequium religiosum) called for in [Lumen Gentium, section 25]."

While acknowledging that the expression 'Gospel of life' is not found as such in the Bible, Evangelium vitae viewed its outworkings as an increasingly "valuable and fruitful area for positive cooperation with our brothers and sisters of other Churches and ecclesial communities", and also "a providential area for dialogue and joint efforts with the followers of other religions and with all people of good will."

See also

Catholic theology of the body
Catholicism and abortion
Christian views on birth control
Church authority
Consistent life ethic
Culture of life
Humanae vitae
Pro-life movements
Religious views on euthanasia
Teachings of Pope John Paul II

References

Further reading
 Complete text of Evangelium vitae from the Vatican publisher Libreria Editrice Vaticana
 http://cdn.theologicalstudies.net/56/56.3/56.3.9.pdf https://web.archive.org/web/20220419132348/http://cdn.theologicalstudies.net/56/56.3/56.3.9.pdf A response to Germain Grisez

Papal encyclicals
Documents of the Catholic Social Teaching tradition
1995 documents
Documents of Pope John Paul II
1995 in Christianity
Catholic Church and abortion
Christianity and capital punishment
March 1995 events